Kimura Akebono  was a Japanese writer. She is best known for her debut work .

Biography 
Kimura was born Okamoto Eiko on April 10, 1872, in Kobe, Japan. Her father, was a wealthy businessman. He had around 30 children with many women and Kimura was his oldest daughter. She attended Tokyo Women's Higher School and graduated in 1888. While attending school she studied French, and had hoped to study abroad. However, her father refused to allow her to. She married, then divorced the son of a wealthy merchant on her father's orders, after her husband's misbehavior embarrassed the family.

After graduation Kimura worked at a butcher shop called "Iroha" that her father owned in Asakusa. She wrote her first novel,  while working at the cash register in the store. The novel was published serially in the Yomiuri Shinbun in 1889 on the recommendation of Aeba Koson. Kimura was seventeen years old at the time.

 is about a young woman named Hideko who studies abroad in the United Kingdom and trains in the textile industry in the United States. Upon returning to Japan, Hideko starts a textile factory of her own where she trains women and helps them achieve financial independence.

Selected works 

 , 1889
 , 1889
 , 1890

References 

1872 births
1890 deaths
People from Kobe
19th-century Japanese women writers